Tenías que ser tú (English: It Had To Be You) is a Mexican telenovela produced by Mapat L. de Zatarain that premiered on Las Estrellas on 12 March 2018 and ended on 8 July 2018. It is an adaptation of the Chilean telenovela titled Ámbar created by Daniella Castagno. It stars Ariadne Díaz, Andrés Palacios and Fernando Alonso.

The production of the telenovela began on January 8, 2018.

Plot 
The telenovela tells the story of Marisa and her 8-year-old daughter, Nicole, who live in Villahermosa with grandmother María Elena and nana Jaquie, but their lives change when a job opportunity for Marisa, in the Real Estate business, takes them to move to Mexico City.

Cast

Main 
 Ariadne Díaz as Marisa Santiesteban Elorza
 Andrés Palacios as Miguel "Miky" Carreto
 Arturo Peniche as Ezequiel Pineda Domínguez
 Chantal Andere as Lorenza
 Grettell Valdez as Jenifer Pineda Salgado "Jeny"
 Fernando Alonso as Marcelo Moret
 Rossana Nájera as Amaranta
 Ana Paula Martínez as Nicole Santiesteban Elorza
 Ricardo Margaleff as Bryan
 Polo Morín as Bruno
 Raquel Garza as Amanda
 Agustín Arana as Tadeo Fernández
 Sachi Tamashiro as Jaquie
 Valentina de los Cobos as Lucy
 Emilio Beltrán as Santiago
 Jessica Decote as Lesly
 Aldo Guerra as Tino Carreto
 Karla Farfán as Paulina
 Dayren Chávez as Simona
 Mónica Zorti
 Elena Lizárraga as Olga
 Paola Toyos
 María Marcela as Marbella
 Nubia Martí as La Nena

Special guest stars 
 Latin Lover as Willy
 Roberto Miquel
 Arturo Vázquez
 Wendy Braga
 Janina Hidalgo
 Kelchie Arizmendi as Julia

Ratings 
 
}}

Episodes

Awards and nominations

References

External links 
 

Mexican telenovelas
Televisa telenovelas
2018 telenovelas
2018 Mexican television series debuts
2018 Mexican television series endings
Spanish-language telenovelas
2010s Mexican television series
Television shows set in Mexico City
Television shows set in Puebla
Comedy telenovelas
Mexican television series based on Chilean television series